Guilford-Bower Farm House is a historic home in New Paltz in Ulster County, New York. It was built about 1850 and is a large 2-story brick residence with a -story brick kitchen wing.

It was listed on the National Register of Historic Places in 1999.

References

Houses on the National Register of Historic Places in New York (state)
Houses completed in 1850
Houses in Ulster County, New York
National Register of Historic Places in Ulster County, New York